Onion skinning, in 2D computer graphics, is a technique used in creating animated cartoons and editing movies to see several frames at once. This way, the animator or editor can make decisions on how to create or change an image based on the previous image in the sequence. 

In traditional animation, the individual frames of a movie were initially drawn on thin onionskin paper over a light source. The animators (mostly inbetweeners) would put the previous and next drawings exactly beneath the working drawing, so that they could draw the 'in between'  to give a smooth motion.

In computer software, this effect is achieved by making frames translucent and projecting them on top of each other.

This effect can also be used to create motion blurs, as seen in The Matrix when characters dodge bullets.

See also 
 Anime Studio
 Adobe Flash
 TVPaint
 3ds max

External links 
Onion Skinning in I Can Animate
 Shape Shifter at Aniboom. To see onion skinning, press 'o' then create a shape, add a frame, move your shape, and repeat.
Animation techniques
Computer graphic techniques